The 2019–20 season was Al Ain Football Club's 46rd in existence and the club's 44st consecutive season in the top-level football league in the UAE.

Squad list
Players and squad numbers last updated on 20 September 2019.Note: Flags indicate national team as has been defined under FIFA eligibility rules. Players may hold more than one non-FIFA nationality.

Pre-season

Competitions

Overview

{| class="wikitable" style="text-align: center"
|-
!rowspan=2|Competition
!colspan=8|Record
!rowspan=2|Started round
!rowspan=2|Final position / round
!rowspan=2|First match	
!rowspan=2|Last match
|-
!
!
!
!
!
!
!
!
|-
| Pro-League

|  
| Cancelled
| 20 September 2019
| 14 March 2020
|-
| President's Cup

| Final 
| Cancelled
| 23 December 2019
| 10 March 2020
|-
| League Cup

| Group stage 
| Semi-finals
| 23 August 2019
| 10 January 2020
|-
| Champions League

| Play-off round 
| Group Stage 
| 28 January 2020
| 24 September 2020
|-
! Total

|  
|  
| 23 August 2019
| 24 September 2020

UAE Pro-League

League table

Results summary

Results by round

Matches

President's Cup

League Cup

Group A

Knockout stage

2020 AFC Champions League

Play-off round

Group stage

Group D

Squad information

Playing statistics

|-
! colspan=16 style=background:#dcdcdc; text-align:center| Goalkeepers

|-
! colspan=16 style=background:#dcdcdc; text-align:center| Defenders

|-
! colspan=16 style=background:#dcdcdc; text-align:center| Midfielders

|-
! colspan=16 style=background:#dcdcdc; text-align:center| Forwards

|-
! colspan=16 style=background:#dcdcdc; text-align:center| Players transferred out during the season

Goalscorers
Includes all competitive matches. The list is sorted alphabetically by surname when total goals are equal.

Assists

Clean sheets
Includes all competitive matches.

Hat-tricks

(H) – Home ; (A) – Away

Transfers

In

Out

References

External links
 Al Ain FC official website 

2019-20
Emirati football clubs 2019–20 seasons